Szypliszki  is a village in Suwałki County, Podlaskie Voivodeship, in north-eastern Poland, close to the border with Lithuania. It is the seat of the gmina (administrative district) called Gmina Szypliszki.

The village has a population of 300.

References

Villages in Suwałki County
Białystok Voivodeship (1919–1939)